Evolutionary dynamics is the study of the mathematical principles according to which biological organisms as well as cultural ideas evolve and evolved. This is mostly achieved through the mathematical discipline of population genetics, along with evolutionary game theory. Most population genetics considers changes in the frequencies of alleles at a small number of gene loci. When infinitesimal effects at a large number of gene loci are considered, one derives quantitative genetics. Traditional population genetic models deal with alleles and genotypes, and are frequently stochastic. In evolutionary game theory, developed first by John Maynard Smith, evolutionary biology concepts may take a deterministic mathematical form, with selection acting directly on inherited phenotypes. These same models can be applied to studying the evolution of human preferences and ideologies. Many variants on these models have been developed, which incorporate weak selection, mutual population structure, stochasticity, etc. These models have relevance also to the generation and maintenance of tissues in mammals, since an  understanding of tissue cell kinetics, architecture, and development from adult stem cells has important implications for aging and cancer.

References

External links
Evolutionary Game Dynamics from Clay Mathematics Institute

 
Evolutionary biology